Hacienda Vieja is a district of the Orotina canton, in the Alajuela province of Costa Rica.

Geography 
Hacienda Vieja has an area of  km² and an elevation of  metres.

Demographics 

For the 2011 census, Hacienda Vieja had a population of  inhabitants.

Transportation

Road transportation 
The district is covered by the following road routes:
 National Route 27

References 

Districts of Alajuela Province
Populated places in Alajuela Province